Kaffenberger is a German surname. Notable people with the surname include:

 Marcel Kaffenberger (born 1994), German footballer and coach
 Marco Kaffenberger (born 1996), German footballer

German-language surnames